Dorothy Mackaill (March 4, 1903 – August 12, 1990) was a British-American actress, most active during the silent-film era and into the pre-Code era of the early 1930s.

Early life
Born in Sculcoates, Kingston upon Hull in 1903 (although she later would claim 1904 or 1905 as her year of birth, including on her petition for naturalization as a United States citizen, giving 1904 as the year), Mackaill lived with her father after her parents separated when she was around eleven years old. She attended Thoresby Primary School. As a teenager, Mackaill ran away to London to pursue a stage career as an actress.

At age 16, she danced in Joybelles at London's Hippodrome and worked in Paris acting in a few minor Pathé films. She met a Broadway stage choreographer who persuaded her to migrate to New York City, where aged 17 she became active in the Ziegfeld Follies, dancing in his Midnight Frolic review.

Career
By 1920, Mackaill had begun making the transition from "Follies Girl" to film actress. That same year she appeared in her first film, a Wilfred Noy-directed mystery, The Face at the Window. Mackaill also appeared in several comedies of 1920 opposite actor Johnny Hines. In 1921, she appeared opposite Anna May Wong, Noah Beery and Lon Chaney in the Marshall Neilan-directed drama Bits of Life. In the following years, Mackaill would appear opposite such popular actors as Richard Barthelmess, Rod La Rocque, Colleen Moore, John Barrymore, George O'Brien, Bebe Daniels, Milton Sills and Anna Q. Nilsson.

Mackaill rose to leading-lady status in the drama The Man Who Came Back (1924), opposite rugged matinee idol George O'Brien. In 1924, she also starred in the western film The Mine with the Iron Door, shot on location outside of Tucson, Arizona. That same year, the Western Association of Motion Picture Advertisers of the United States presented Mackaill with one of its WAMPAS Baby Stars awards, which each year honored thirteen young women whom the association believed to be on the threshold of movie stardom. Other notable recipients of the award in 1924 were Clara Bow, Julanne Johnston and Lucille Ricksen. Her career continued to flourish throughout the remainder of the 1920s, as she made a smooth transition to sound with the part-talkie The Barker (1928).

Later career and retirement
In September 1928, First National Pictures was acquired by Warner Bros., and her contract with First National was not renewed in 1931. Her most memorable role of this era was the 1932 Columbia Pictures B film release Love Affair (1932) with a then little-known Humphrey Bogart as her leading man. She made several films for MGM, Paramount and Columbia before retiring in 1937, to care for her ailing mother.

In 1955, Mackaill moved to Honolulu, Hawaii. She had fallen in love with the islands while filming His Captive Woman (1929). Mackaill lived at the luxurious Royal Hawaiian Hotel on the beach at Waikiki as a sort of celebrity-in-residence and enjoyed swimming in the ocean nearly every day.

She occasionally came out of retirement to appear in television productions, including two episodes of Hawaii Five-O in 1976 and 1980.

Personal life

Mackaill was married three times. Her first marriage was to German film director Lothar Mendes, on November 17, 1926. They divorced in August 1928. On November 4, 1931, she married radio singer Neil Albert Miller. They divorced in February 1934. Her third and final marriage was to horticulturist Harold Patterson in June 1947. She filed for divorce in December 1948.

Mackaill had no children.

Naturalization as United States citizen
Mackaill became a naturalized United States citizen in 1926, giving 1904 as her year of birth, and her age as 22.

Death
Mackaill resided in Honolulu, Hawaii, during the last 35 years of her life. She died there of liver failure in her room at the Royal Hawaiian Hotel on August 12, 1990. She was cremated and her ashes scattered off Waikiki Beach.

Filmography

References

External links

 
 
 Photographs of Dorothy Mackaill

1903 births
1990 deaths
20th-century American actresses
Actresses from Honolulu
Actresses from Kingston upon Hull
American film actresses
American silent film actresses
American stage actresses
American television actresses
English silent film actresses
20th-century English actresses
English actresses
British emigrants to the United States
Ziegfeld girls
Deaths from kidney failure
WAMPAS Baby Stars
Naturalized citizens of the United States